Observatory is a Suburb in Johannesburg's east and is located in Region E of the City of Johannesburg Metropolitan Municipality; it borders the suburbs of Houghton Estate, Cyrildene, Linksfield, Bellevue, Bellevue East and Dewetshof.

History
It is named for the Union Observatory established in early 1903 (today's Johannesburg Observatory), sited on Observatory Ridge, the city's highest point. The suburb is situated on part of an old Witwatersrand farm called Doornfontein. It was established in 1903.

It is a well-established suburb: Observatory Girls' Primary was founded in 1918, and Observatory Golf Course (1912) is the oldest golf club in Johannesburg still operating from its original ground. The suburb housed the Yeshivah Gedolah of Johannesburg, until its relocation to Glenhazel.

References

External links
Observatory, Johannesburg Information, wheretostay.co.za
Suburb Map, maps.brabys.co.za

Johannesburg Region F